The ruined Kudryntsi Castle (Kudrynets'kyi zamok) is perched on a hilltop overlooking the Zbruch River in Chortkiv Raion, Ternopil Oblast, Ukraine, 25 km west of a larger fortress in Kamianets-Podilskyi. It was built in the early 17th century by Jan Szczęsny Herburt and throughout the ensuing century was subjected to repeated sieges by the Cossacks and the Turks. By the 19th century, some portions of the walls had crumbled away, and the structure was abandoned to its fate.

References
 Памятники градостроительства и архитектуры Украинской ССР. В 4-х томах. Гл. Редкол.: Н. Л. Жариков. -К.: Будівельник, 1983–1986. Том 4, с.49.

External links
 A Russian page about the Kudryntsi Castle

Castles in Ternopil Oblast
Castles in Ukraine
Buildings and structures completed in the 17th century